Allans Music was a chain of music stores in Australia. It sold all categories of musical instruments, instrument accessories and sheet music. In 2010 it became Allans Billy Hyde, but collapsed in 2012. It collapsed again in 2018, but into voluntary administration. Shortly after, the Australian Taxation Office ordered the company to enter liquidation.

History

Allans was established in May, 1850 when Joseph Wilkie and John Campbell Webster started a music warehouse (Wilkie and Webster) in Collins Street, Melbourne. George Leavis Allan joined the company in 1862, then twelve years after becoming a junior partner Allan found himself sole proprietor. (The original store had signage "Wilkie, Webster & Allan".) His son George became a partner in 1881 when the name of the firm was formally altered to Allan & Co. By 1877 it was the largest musical warehouse south of the equator, a distinction it retained; in spite of many changes in musical retailing, the firm of Allan built its name into the record of Australian music. The company subsequently became Allans Music Australia Ltd.

It was bought by Brashs, to become Australia's biggest music retail chain. Brashs collapsed (going into receivership in 1994 and in 1998), and Allans Music was subsequently bought by private investors, including The Roland Corporation. In 2005 The Brackenbury Group acquired Allans Music and as at 2009, operated seven physical stores (three in Victoria, two in New South Wales and one each in Queensland and South Australia) and an online presence.

2012 and 2018 demise

In 2010, Allans Music merged with Billy Hyde Music to become the largest music retailer in Australia.

The company was later placed into receivership on 23 August 2012. All stores with the exception of Mona Vale (New South Wales), Shepparton (Victoria), and Darwin (Northern Territory) faced imminent closure. In November 2012, the majority of the Allans/Billy Hyde stores were liquidated. The final day of trading was on Sunday, 25 November. On 28 November 2012, it was announced that rival music company Gallins music had successfully purchased Allans Billy Hyde effective that date, meaning major stores would re open.

The company was placed in voluntary administration on 20 June 2018 after mass store closures to downsize the company and allegedly again owing employees.

On 20 July, the company faced court over a case with the ATO and the Federal Court declared the Group insolvent and ordered it to be wound up. The company appointed Ferrier Hodgson as voluntary administrator and liquidator and was looking to still sell the business, but was holding a liquidation sale at the same time.

References

External links
The History of Allans Music

Music companies of Australia
Retail companies established in 1850
Musical instrument retailers
2012 disestablishments in Australia
Australian companies disestablished in 2018
Australian companies established in 1850
Defunct retail companies of Australia